Cleomenes of Rhegium (Greek: Kλεoμένης Kleoménes; 5th-century BC) was a Greek dithyrambic poet, apparently from Rhegium in Magna Graecia.

Reputation 
According to Athenaeus, Cleomenes is censured by Chionides:

He is also censured by Aristophanes, according to the Scholiast on The Clouds:

Cleomenes seems to have been an erotic writer, since Epicrates mentions him (in his Anti-Lais, quoted by Athenaeus) in connexion with other such writers:

The allusions of other comedians to him fix his date in the latter part of the 5th-century BC.

Athenaeus mentions one of his poems by name:

References

Sources 

 Smith, Philip (1867). "Cleomenes, literary. 2.". In Smith, William (ed.). Dictionary of Greek and Roman Biography and Mythology. Vol. 1: Abaeus–Dysponteus. Boston: Little, Brown, and Company. p. 796.

External links 

 Dyer, Robert, et al., eds. (2015). "Κυκλίων τε χορω̂ν ᾀσματοκάμπας". Suda On Line. Retrieved 8 May 2022.
 Smith, Andrew, ed. (2021). "Cleomenes – in ancient sources". Attalus. Retrieved 8 May 2022.

5th-century BC Greek people
Poets of Magna Graecia